"The Wayward Wind" is a country song written by Stanley Lebowsky (music) and Herb Newman (lyrics).

Members of the Western Writers of America chose the song as one of the Top 100 Western songs of all time.

Background
The “Wayward Wind” of the title is a metaphor for wanderlust: an irrepressible urge to travel and explore. This is further emphasized by describing it as a "restless wind." In the context of the 19th century setting of shanty towns and railroads, the Western United States was still largely unexplored by European settlers. Concurrent to the era of lone cowboys on horseback, the First transcontinental railroad was built. Steam trains were a gateway the American frontier romanticized in literature, songs and film. The subject of the song is a young man, living near train tracks, instilled with an irrepressible urge to travel by the sound of passing trains. On his travels he falls in love and attempts to settle down and lead a normal life, but the urge to wander is too strong. The phrase "Next of kin”, which is a colloquialism meaning the person's closest living relative, may suggest that the wandering man has no family or connection and will perhaps wander his entire life.

Originally recorded and sung in third person narration from the point of view of the young man’s lover/wife, by female pop singer Gogi Grant, the song is often adapted to male singers and sung in first person from the POV of the young man.

Recordings
In 1956, versions were recorded by Gogi Grant, Tex Ritter, and Jimmy Young, of which Grant's was the biggest seller in the United States and Ritter's in the United Kingdom. The song reached No. 1 on the Cash Box chart, which combined all recorded versions, while Grant's version reached No. 1 on the Billboard chart on its own. Billboard ranked it as the No. 5 song for 1956. It became a Gold record. Ritter used the song to open his stage shows.

In 1961, Grant's recording was reissued and reached Billboard No. 50 and Cash Box No. 78. In 1963, a new recording was made by Frank Ifield, which reached No. 1 on the UK Singles Chart for three weeks duration.

The song made the Billboard country chart in a version by Irish flautist James Galway with vocal accompaniment by American country singer Sylvia. Produced in Nashville by Bill Pursell, the single was released in 1982 and it rose to No. 57 in 1983.

Notable cover versions
Gogi Grant (1956) No. 1 (U.S.), No. 9 (UK) 
Tex Ritter (1956) No. 28 (U.S.), No. 8 (UK) 
Jimmy Young (1956) No. 27 (UK)
Frank Ifield (1963) No. 1 (UK), No. 16 (Australia), No. 3 (Ireland), No. 104 (U.S.) 
James Galway featuring Sylvia (1982) No. 57 (U.S.)
Anne Murray (1994) No. 7 (Canada)

Chart performance

Anne Murray

Year-end charts

References

1956 songs
Sylvia (singer) songs
Tex Ritter songs
Frank Ifield songs
Songs written by Stanley Lebowsky
1956 singles
1963 singles
UK Singles Chart number-one singles
Number-one singles in the United States